Durak (also Romanized as Dūrak) is a village in Susan-e Gharbi Rural District, Susan District, Izeh County, Khuzestan Province, Iran. In the 2006 census, its population was 267 people across 47 families.

References 

Populated places in Izeh County